Ilex malaccensis is a species of plant in the family Aquifoliaceae.  It is distributed from Sumatra to New Guinea, with specimens from New Guinea differing from the western members of this species by their smaller leaves which are rust-coloured below.

References

malaccensis